Nepotilla tropicalis is a species of sea snail, a marine gastropod mollusk in the family Raphitomidae.

Description
The length of the shell attains 1.55 mm, its diameter 0.85 mm.

The minute shell is subscalar. Its colour is dull white. It contains 4 whorls, of which 1½ form the protoconch. Each whorl spreads in a broad shelf above, and thence narrows anteriorly. 

Sculpture:—On the body whorl there are four, and on the earlier two, spiral cords, the topmost running
along the angle of the shell. The radials which over-ride these are thin elevated lamellae, commencing at the suture and ending as imbricating scales on the snout. There are sixteen on the body whorl. The outer lip is simple. The sinus is short and subsutural. The siphonal canal is short.

Distribution
This marine species is endemic to Australia and occurs off Queensland.

References

 Powell, A.W.B. 1966. The molluscan families Speightiidae and Turridae, an evaluation of the valid taxa, both Recent and fossil, with list of characteristic species. Bulletin of the Auckland Institute and Museum. Auckland, New Zealand 5: 1–184, pls 1–23

External links
 

tropicalis
Gastropods described in 1922
Gastropods of Australia